The siege of Lastovo in 1000 was part of the campaign of Doge Pietro II Orseolo in southern Croatia and its bloodiest armed conflict between the citizens of Lastovo island and the army of Venice. The siege resulted in a Venetian victory and Lastovo was annexed into the Venetian republic.

Background 
 
After the death of Croatian King Stjepan Držislav in 997, an ally of the Byzantine Empire, who ruled in the last three decades of the 10th century and was recognized by Byzantine emperor as the king of Croatia and Dalmatia, his eldest son and successor Svetoslav Suronja continued the pro-Byzantine policy, but his younger sons Krešimir and Gojslav started to organize a rebellion. With the aid of Western Bulgarian (Macedonian) emperor Samuil, Krešimir and Gojslav managed to remove Svetoslav Suronja from the Croatian throne in 1000 and forced him to seek refuge in Venice.

At the same time, Doge Pietro II Orseolo prepared Venetian forces to take control over Dalmatian cities that were part of the Byzantine Empire, Croatia, and Narentines. Since the maritime city populations were mostly Latin, the majority of cities welcomed the Venetian ruler, but some of them did not. In particular, the island of Lastovo fiercely resisted the Venetian incursion.

Siege 

The exact date of the siege of Lastovo is not known. According to John the Deacon, Orseolo's chronicler, the doge attended the Holy Mass on Ascension Day (9 May 1000) in Venice. Then he led his fleet towards Grado to visit the patriarch and on 11 May he sailed southwards.

As the fleet reached Lastovo, the residents of the town did not welcome it, but waited behind the city walls, ready to resist. Orseolo ordered them to surrender but they refused, so he started to attack the town. His troops besieged it, trying to break the town gate as well as to seize the towers of the wall. They succeeded in capturing the tower with the water cistern, which was a big setback for the remaining defenders. Finally they were forced to surrender and to lay down their weapons. The doge spared their lives, but gave the order to his soldiers to destroy the defensive walls and to burn down the town. The citizens were moved away to the other side of the island, where they built a new settlement.

Aftermath 

Pietro II Orseolo subjected Lastovo to Venetian authority. Then he moved further with his fleet towards Dubrovnik, whose dignitaries showed loyalty to him, and returned subsequently to Venice. He started to carry the title of Dux Dalmatianorum (Duke of the Dalmatians).

For the next few decades, the island of Lastovo remained a Venetian possession. It came back and stayed under Croatian rule during the reign of King Stjepan I (ruled 1030-1058) and his successors. In 1252 the residents of Lastovo decided to join the Community of Dubrovnik (ital. Ragusa), (later Republic of Dubrovnik).

See also

 Timeline of Croatian history
 Timeline of the Republic of Venice
 Croatian-Venetian wars
 Siege of Zadar (998)
 Military history of Croatia
 Military history of the Republic of Venice

References

External links
 Doge Pietro II Orseolo concentrated his forces against the islands of Korčula and Lastovo
 Doge Orseolo took over many Dalmatian towns and islands
 Venetians captured Vis in 998 and Lastovo in 1000
 Defenders of Lastovo laid down their arms and Doge resolved to spare them all, insisting only that their town should be destroyed
 King Stjepan I of Croatia continued policy of integrating Dalmatia into the Kingdom of Croatia

1000 in Europe
10th century in the Republic of Venice
Lestovo
Battles involving medieval Croatia
Lestovo
10th century in Croatia
Venetian period in the history of Croatia
Sieges involving Croatia
Siege of Lastovo
10th-century military history of Croatia
1000